George Corley Wallace III, generally known as George Wallace Jr., (born October 17, 1951) is an American politician from the U.S. state of Alabama. He is the only son of George and Lurleen Wallace, each of whom was Democratic governor of Alabama.

Personal life
Wallace was born in Eufaula in Barbour County in southeastern Alabama as the only son of George and Lurleen Wallace, future governors of Alabama. His sisters are Bobbi Jo Wallace Parsons, Peggy Sue Wallace Kennedy, and Janie Lee Wallace Dye. His father was a noted segregationist who ran for President of the United States on four occasions. His mother succeeded her husband as governor following his first term, and served as a surrogate for him until her death from uterine cancer in 1968.

Wallace lived in the Alabama Governor's Mansion in Montgomery during his parents' terms as governor from 1963 to 1968, after which he lived with relatives. In the seventh grade, he was clipped playing football and sustained an injury for which he was hospitalized. He graduated in 1970 from Sidney Lanier High School in Montgomery, completed a bachelor's degree in history at Huntingdon College in Montgomery in 1976, and did graduate work in political science and public administration at Auburn University in Auburn.

Wallace had two sons from his second marriage: George Corley Wallace IV and Robert Kelly Wallace. Wallace IV died on May 12, 2009, at the age of twenty-five, from a self-inflicted gunshot wound. Beforehand, he married for less than a year to an unknown woman. In June 1990, he married Angela Dawn Shoemaker, only to be divorced again in less than 11 months. In 2000, Wallace Jr. married Elizabeth Grimes Maynor and now has two stepdaughters.

Professional and political career
From 1978 to 1987, Wallace worked at Troy University in Troy, Alabama. He was from 1978 to 1982 the director of financial aid and alumni affairs. From 1983 to 1987, he was vice president of development and alumni affairs. During part of the time he was at Troy, the faculty included Max Rafferty, former California Superintendent of Public Instruction, and former Governor John Malcolm Patterson, an intraparty opponent of both of his parents.

In 1986, Wallace was elected Alabama State Treasurer, narrowly winning the Democratic Party primary and runoff over Jim Zeigler and facing no opposition in the general election. He was easily reelected in 1990. He narrowly missed avoiding a runoff in the primary, but prevailed over state welfare commissioner Faye Baggiano, who had nearly toppled Dickinson in the 1990 election. The district had been made more Republican on paper after most of its African-American constituents had been drawn into the black-majority 7th district after the 1990 census in accordance with the Voting Rights Act of 1965. However, Wallace's chances got a significant boost after his expected Republican opponent, State Senator Larry Dixon, lost his primary to Terry Everett, a newspaper publisher from the Wiregrass who had never run for office before. In November, Wallace lost the election in an upset to Everett by just 3,571 votes, less than 1 percent. 

In 1994, while wrapping up his second term as state treasurer, Wallace ran for lieutenant governor, but finished third to Don Siegelman and Ryan DeGraffenried Jr. (DeGraffenried's father, Ryan DeGraffenried Sr., was defeated in the 1962 Democratic gubernatorial runoff by Wallace's father).  After leaving the treasurer's office, Wallace worked at the Center for Government and Public Affairs at Auburn University Montgomery. He switched affiliations to the GOP and was elected in 1998 to the Alabama Public Service Commission (Position 2), having defeated incumbent Democrat Charles B. Martin. He was reelected commissioner in 2002 but did not run again in 2006, when the Republicans nominated former state Representative Perry O. Hooper Jr., of Montgomery. Hooper defeated former state Senator John Amari of Trussville in the Republican primary but then lost the general election to Democrat Susan Parker.

In June 2005 he opened up the first day of the annual national convention of the Council of Conservative Citizens (CofCC), a white nationalist organization. This was not Wallace's first interaction with the CofCC; he gave speeches to the CofCC once in 1998 and twice in 1999. He has also appeared as a guest on The Political Cesspool, a radio talk show that is affiliated with the Tennessee chapter of the CofCC.

Wallace instead sought in 2006 the Republican nomination for lieutenant governor and entered a runoff election with Birmingham attorney Luther Strange. Wallace lost by ten points despite appearances on his behalf from U.S. Senator John McCain of Arizona. Strange, in turn, lost the general election to Democratic nominee Jim Folsom Jr. of Cullman, a son of former Governor Jim Folsom who had previously served as both lieutenant governor and governor. In 2010, Wallace ran in the Republican primary to reclaim his old office of state treasurer, but lost the nomination to banker Young Boozer by nearly thirty points.

References

External links
George Wallace Jr. for Treasurer 

1951 births
Living people
State treasurers of Alabama
Alabama Democrats
Alabama Republicans
Sidney Lanier High School alumni
Huntingdon College alumni
Auburn University alumni
People from Eufaula, Alabama
People from Troy, Alabama
Politicians from Montgomery, Alabama
George Wallace
Wallace family of Alabama